Skärholmen metro station is a station on the red line of the Stockholm metro, located in the district of Skärholmen. The station was opened on 1 March 1967 as the south terminus of an extension from Sätra.

Skärholmen is the closest metro station to the Kungens Kurva area and its adjacent retail park. It is also expected to become an interchange station with the future Spårväg syd (sv) light rail line from 2030.

References

Red line (Stockholm metro) stations
Railway stations opened in 1967